The acoustic contrast factor is a number used to describe the relationship between the densities and the sound velocities (or, equivalently because of the form of the expression, the densities and compressibilities) of two media. It is most often used in the context of biomedical ultrasonic imaging techniques using acoustic contrast agents and in the field of ultrasonic manipulation of particles (acoustophoresis) much smaller than the wavelength using ultrasonic standing waves. In the latter context, the acoustic contrast factor is the number which, depending on its sign, tells whether a given type of particle in a given medium will be attracted to the pressure nodes or anti-nodes.

Example - particle in a medium

The direction of its movement is governed by the physical properties of the particle and the surrounding medium, expressed in the form of an acoustophoretic contrast factor .  

See also
 Acoustic impedance
 Acoustic tweezers

References

Acoustics